Andrew Stephen is the Deputy Dean for Faculty and Research, L’Oréal Professor of Marketing and Director of the Oxford Future of Marketing Initiative at Saïd Business School, University of Oxford. He is known for his work at the intersection of marketing and technology.

Selected research publications
Zhang, Yuchi, Michael Trusov, Andrew T. Stephen, and Zainab Jamal (2017), “Online Shopping and Social Media: Friends or Foes?” Journal of Marketing, 81 (6), 24-41.
Lamberton, Cait and Andrew T. Stephen (2016), “A Thematic Exploration of Digital, Social Media, and Mobile Marketing Research’s Evolution from 2000 to 2015 and an Agenda for Future Research,” Journal of Marketing, 80 (6), 146-172.
Stephen, Andrew T., Peter P. Zubcsek, and Jacob Goldenberg (2016), “Lower Connectivity Is Better: The Effects of Network Structure On Customer Innovativeness In Interdependent Ideation Tasks,” Journal of Marketing Research, 53 (2), 263-279.
Bart, Yakov, Andrew T. Stephen, and Miklos Sarvary (2014), “Which Products Are Best Suited To Mobile Advertising? A Field Study Of Mobile Display Advertising Effects On Consumer Attitudes And Intentions,” Journal of Marketing Research, 51 (3), 270-285.
Toubia, Olivier and Andrew T. Stephen (2013), “Intrinsic Versus Image-Related Motivations in Social Media: Why Do People Contribute Content to Twitter?” Marketing Science, 32 (3), 365-367.
Stephen, Andrew T., and Jeff Galak (2012), "The effects of traditional and social earned media on sales: A study of a microlending marketplace," Journal of Marketing Research, 49(5), 624-639.
Stephen, Andrew T., and Olivier Toubia (2010), "Deriving value from social commerce networks," Journal of Marketing Research, 47(2), 215-228.

Awards 
 American Marketing Association TechSIG Lazaridis Institute Prize (2016).
 American Marketing Association Shelby D. Hunt/Harold H. Maynard Award (2016).
 Listed as one of the “40 Best Business Professors Under 40” by Poets & Quants (2015).

External links
Forbes Contributor

References

Living people
Saïd Business School
Year of birth missing (living people)